, formerly Japan Credit Bureau, is a credit card company based in Tokyo, Japan. It is accepted at JCB merchants, and has strategic alliances with Discover Network merchants in the United States, UnionPay merchants in China, American Express merchants in Canada, and RuPay merchants in India.

History 
Founded in 1961 as Japan Credit Bureau, JCB established itself in the Japanese credit card market when it purchased Osaka Credit Bureau in 1968.  its cards are issued to 130 million customers in 23 countries. JCB also operates a network of membership airport lounges for holders of their Platinum Cards issued outside Japan.

Since 1981, JCB has been expanding its business overseas. JCB cards are issued in 24 countries, in most countries JCB is affiliated with financial institutions to license them to issue JCB-branded cards.  All international operations are conducted through its 100%-owned subsidiary, JCB International Credit Card Co., Ltd.

In the United States, JCB is not a primary credit card network such as Visa, MasterCard, Discover, or American Express. While the brand was primarily accepted by tourism-related businesses such as airlines, car rental companies, hotels, Japanese speciality retailers and some department stores, it gained wider acceptance when on August 23, 2006 JCB announced an alliance with the Discover Network. The two companies signed a long-term agreement that led to the acceptance of Discover Network brand cards at JCB point-of-sale terminals in Japan and of JCB cards on the Discover network in the U.S. This partnership became operational in 2011.

Local JCB accounts in the United States were issued by JCB USA, and offered to residents of California, Connecticut, Illinois, New York, New Jersey, Oregon, Washington and Hawaii. JCB USA stopped issuing JCB cards in the American market on January 8, 2018, and closed all current consumer credit card accounts on April 30, 2018. Foreign JCB cards continue to work through the Discover network partnership.

References

External links 

 
 
 

Credit cards
Credit card issuer associations
Financial services companies based in Tokyo
Financial services companies established in 1961
Midori-kai
1961 establishments in Japan